Andhhagadu ( Blind Handsome Man) is a 2017 Telugu-language comedy thriller film, produced by Sunkara Ramabrahmam on AK Entertainments Pvt Ltd banner and directed by Veligonda Srinivas. The film stars Raj Tarun and Hebah Patel in the lead roles, while Rajendra Prasad, Ashish Vidyarthi, Sayaji Shinde, and Raja Ravindra play supporting roles.  The music is composed by Shekar Chandra. This movie was declared a hit at the box office. The movie was remade in Odia in 2018 as Sriman Surdas starring Babushan and Bhumika.

Plot
Gautham (Raj Tarun) an orphan blinded youngster who is in search of an eye donor and a soulmate. Once he falls for an eye specialist Dr. Netra (Hebah Patel) and starts inspiring her by acting as normal. After a few comic incidents, Netra also loves him, but when she discovers the reality, she dumps him. A heartbroken Gautham decides to love a girl finer than her. Meanwhile, Netra arranges a donor for Gautham, and within no time, he regains his eyesight. Thereafter everyday, Gautham gets some mysterious dreams. Now Gautham again falls for Netra without knowing her identity. She pretends to act as dumb as he may recognize her voice. Later, Gautham realizes the truth when the rift erases between them. Suddenly, one day, a man named Ranjith Kulkarni (Rajendra Prasad) enters into Gautham's life claiming to be Netra's father. He keeps a few funny tests to him, such as conducting all medical tests, nonstop 100 rounds in the ground and removing breaks from the vehicle of Assistant Commissioner Dharma (Sayaji Shinde). Right now, he invites Gautham to his house for finalizing the match, where surprisingly, Gautham spots Dharma as Netra's father and he affirms the fact. Here as a flabbergast, Netra reveals that Kulkarni has passed away two months ago and his eyes are only transplanted to him. Soon, Gautham realizes it as Kulkarni's soul. Now, Kulkarni divulges his past that he is a sincere journalist who has been slaughtered by a dreadful goon Pantham Babji (Raja Ravindra). Hereupon, he wants to take avenge through Gautham, for which he refuses. There onwards, Kulkarni makes Gautham's life miserable by creating an enmity with Babji. Gautham narrates the entire story to an eye specialist Dr. Ashish (Ashish Vidyarthi) and requests him to remove his eyes. Fortunately, Ashish is a close friend of Dharma who convinces him that whatever Gautham is stating is fact. At that point in time, Ashish learns that Kulkarni is a businessman. He immediately he rushes Gautham's residence and understands his play. At present, he seeks Gautham for actuality, and then he narrates the real past. In Gautham's childhood, at the blind school, he used to have three friends who went to eye transplants. On their way back, they witness a murder made by Babji, for which he killed them. Hence, he has drawn up this revenge scheme, eventually, Babji also detects it and kidnaps Netra. At last, Gautham eliminates Babji in the name of Kulkarni. Finally, Gautham marries Netra, and on their first night, surprisingly, Kulkarni's soul really appears and frightens him to help in taking his true vengeance.

Cast

Raj Tarun as Gautham
Hebah Patel as Dr. Netra
Rajendra Prasad as Ranjith Kulkarni
Ashish Vidyarthi as Dr. Ashish
Sayaji Shinde as ACP Dharma, Netra's father
Raja Ravindra as Pantham Babji
Satya as Kishore 
Satyam Rajesh as Rajesh 
Jaya Prakash Reddy as Lawyer 
Paruchuri Venkateswara Rao as Father Krishna 
Fish Venkat as Babji's henchmen
Prabhakar
Ananth
Ratnasagar as Netra's grandmother

Soundtrack

Music composed by Shekar Chandra. Music released on ADITYA Music Company.

Reception 
A critic from The Hindu wrote that "At the end of Andhhagadu you might wonder what was it that the makers set out to do. It's a revenge drama cloaked as a comedy".

References

External links

2017 films
2010s comedy thriller films
Films about blind people in India
2010s Telugu-language films
Indian comedy thriller films
Indian films about revenge
2017 masala films
Telugu films remade in other languages
2017 comedy films